Klopce may refer to the following:

Klopce, Žužemberk
Klopce, Dol pri Ljubljani
Klopce, Slovenska Bistrica